Mullen High School (formerly J.K. Mullen High School) is a Roman Catholic, Brothers of the Christian Schools, college-preparatory high school in Denver, Colorado.  It is run independently within the Archdiocese of Denver.

History

Mullen High School was named for John Kernan Mullen, businessman, philanthropist, and founder of the Colorado Milling and Elevator Company.  Together with his wife, Catherine, Mullen envisioned the founding of a high school in Denver for orphaned boys.  In 1928, working with Henry Tihen, Mullen contacted Edward Flanagan, the founder of Boys Town, for advice on how best to design and operate such a school.  Following Flanagan's recommendation, Mullen wrote to the Christian Brothers of St. John Baptist de La Salle in Santa Fe, New Mexico, and invited them to be the directors and teachers of his planned school.

In June 1928, Mullen opened negotiations with the De La Salle Christian Brothers. However, both Catherine and John Mullen died before the project could be completed, but their daughters and their husbands carried on with their plans. They purchased a  plot of land on the outskirts of Denver known as the Shirley Farm Dairy. An agreement was made that would allow the dairy to remain in operation in exchange for the students’ opportunity to work in the dairy and receive training in agriculture and mechanics. On April 8, 1932, 17 boys and three brothers moved into the new J.K. Mullen Home for Boys.

Since then, Mullen High School has experienced four distinct eras of change and growth:

 1931–1950, when the school was conducted for orphan boys only, who both attended school and worked in the dairy farm;
 1950–1965, when paying boarders and day students joined the orphans as students, the school's farm operations ended and its name was changed to J.K. Mullen High School;
 1966–1989, when the last of the orphans graduated, the boarding section closed, and the school became a four-year college preparatory high school for boys;
 1989–present, when the school became a co-educational high school and modernized its facilities and programs.

Extracurricular activities

Athletics

State championships

Notable alumni

Frank McNulty, Colorado legislator, former Speaker of the House (Colorado House of Representatives)
David Tate (American football), NFL safety, Chicago Bears
Bo Scaife, NFL football player
J. K. Scott, NFL Punter, Los Angeles Chargers
Scott Wedman, basketball player
Brendan Winters, basketball player
Alex Smith (tight end), NFL tight end
Chester Burnett (American football), NFL linebacker
Ryan Hewitt, NFL football player
Sam Haggerty, MLB player
Jim Deidel, MLB player
Mark Holzemer, MLB pitcher

Notes and references
7. Mullen High School Alumni, The Baseball Cube. http://www.thebaseballcube.com/hs/profile.asp?ID=427

External links
 

Catholic secondary schools in Colorado
High schools in Denver
Colorado
Educational institutions established in 1931
Roman Catholic Archdiocese of Denver
1931 establishments in Colorado